Loch Sween ( or ) is a sea loch located near Lochgilphead, Argyll and Bute, Scotland.  Castle Sween is located on the southern shore towards the seaward end of the loch. The village of Tayvallich, a favoured haven for water craft as it sits at the head of sheltered Loch a' Bhealaich, lies on the northern shore.

The shape of the loch, which is oriented from south west to north east, is complex. The inner, eastern end has several inlets. Caol Scotnish is a very narrow finger that reaches further north and east than the main body of water. Loch a' Bhealaich is to its south and west. There is the small, bridged embayment of Loch Craiglin on the south side of the inner loch and another larger inlet  incorporating Bàgh na h-Araich Glaise that leads to the settlement of Achnamara. Linne Mhuirich is a long narrow inlet about halfway down the loch on the north side. The bay of Ceann an t-Sàilein lies between the Island of Danna and the main loch at the western end. Danna is now joined to the mainland by a causeway but at one time small craft could have travelled from Loch Sween into Loch na Cille to the north.

There are a variety of islands on the northern shore. Close to Danna are the islets of Eilean à Chapuill, Eilean nan Uan and Liath Eilean. The low-lying Ulva Islands and Taynish Island are farther east. Cala and Eilean Loain are on the southern shore further east with  tidal Eilean Mhartan and tiny Sgeir Dubh beyond them in the Araich Glaise inlet. The Fairy Islands, including  Eilean a' Bhrein are in yet another inlet to the north and  Eilean na Circe, which contains the ruins of a "fortified dwelling" is in the confines of Caol Scotnish.

The inner loch contains maerl beds and burrowed mud, and supports a colony of volcano worm, whilst the sea bed in the more strongly tidal areas at the mouth of the is composed of coarser sediments. The loch is also home to one of Scotland's most important populations of native oyster.

Loch Sween was designated as a Nature Conservation Marine Protected Area (NCMPA) in 2014, and is considered to be a Category IV protected area by the International Union for Conservation of Nature.

Notes

References
 

Sween
Sween
Fjards of Scotland
Nature Conservation Marine Protected Areas of Scotland